Philomène Marie Charlotte Gaudérique Félicité Ghislaine de Lévis-Mirepoix, Countess Jules de La Forest Divonne (11 August 1887 – 27 July 1978), better known by her pen name Claude Silve, was a French writer. She was a recipient of the Prix Femina, a French literary prize, in 1935 for her novel Bénédiction.

She also received the Prix Maillé-Latour-Landry of the Académie Française in 1912 for her first book, La Cité des lampes. 

Silve was born into a noble family, the House of Lévis (better known as the Lévis-Mirepoix), and was the sister of writer and historian Antoine de Lévis-Mirepoix. 

On 29 May 1927 she married Count Joseph François Marie Jules de la Forest Divonne, thus becoming Countess Jules de La Forest Divonne, though she is most commonly remembered by her pen name.

Works 
 1912: La Cité des lampes
 1929: La Fièvre bleue
 1935: Bénédiction, Prix Femina
 1936: Le Palertin
 1937: Arpèges
 1938: Un jardin vers l'Est
 1941: Lumière cendrée

References

External links 
 Claude Silve on Babelio
 Claiude Silve on the site of the Académie française
 
 Une terre de l'esprit by Claude Silve on Revue des deux mondes

1887 births
1978 deaths
20th-century French non-fiction writers
Prix Femina winners
20th-century French women writers
People from Ariège (department)